Derriksite is a very rare uranium mineral with the chemical formula Cu4(UO2)(SeO3)2(OH)6•H2O. It is a secondary mineral that contains copper, uranium and the rarer selenium. It is a bright green to duller bottle green colour. Its crystal habit is acicular, it is most likely to be found along with the uranyl selenium mineral demesmaekerite, but derriksite is much rarer than demesmaekerite. It is named after Jean Marie Francois Joseph Derriks (1912–1992), geologist and administrator of the Union Minière du Haut Katanga (UMHK). It has a Mohs hardness of about 2.

References

Further reading

Uranium(VI) minerals
Selenium minerals
Copper(II) minerals
Oxide minerals
Orthorhombic minerals
Minerals in space group 31